New Windsor may refer to:

United States
New Windsor, Illinois
New Windsor, Maryland
New Windsor College, two defunct colleges
New Windsor Historic District
New Windsor, New York, a town
New Windsor (CDP), New York, a census-designated place in the town
New Windsor Cantonment State Historic Site
New Windsor Township, South Carolina, an 18th-century township that included Savannah Town, South Carolina
New Windsor Hotel, previously the 6th Avenue Hotel, a historic building in Phoenix, Arizona

Elsewhere
New Windsor, New Zealand, Auckland
Windsor, Berkshire, England, previously officially designated New Windsor

See also

 
 Windsor (disambiguation)